The 2004–05 New Jersey Nets season was the Nets' 38th season in the National Basketball Association, and 29th season in East Rutherford, New Jersey. Without Kenyon Martin, who was traded to the Denver Nuggets in the offseason, the Nets stumbled out of the gate losing 11 of their first 13 games including a nine-game losing streak, as Jason Kidd missed the first month of the season from offseason knee surgery. In December, the Nets made a move acquiring All-Star guard Vince Carter from the Toronto Raptors in a trade for Alonzo Mourning, Eric Williams, and Aaron Williams. Mourning did not report to Toronto and he was waived not long after the trade. He later signed with the Miami Heat for his second stint. By the time Carter arrived, Kidd returned from his knee surgery. Richard Jefferson spent most of the season on injured reserve due to a wrist injury. The Kidd and Carter duo-led Nets won 10 of their final 12 games to finished with a 42–40 record, winning a tie-breaker for the #8 seed in the Eastern Conference over the Cleveland Cavaliers. Carter was selected for the 2005 NBA All-Star Game.

In the first round of the playoffs, New Jersey faced the top-seeded Miami Heat, led by Shaquille O'Neal and a young Dwyane Wade. They were eliminated from the playoffs by the Heat in four straight games. It was the Nets' first round playoff exit since 1998. Following the season, Brian Scalabrine signed with the Boston Celtics.

Offseason

Draft picks

Roster

Regular season

Season standings

z – clinched division title
y – clinched division title
x – clinched playoff spot

Record vs. opponents

Game log

Playoffs

|- align="center" bgcolor="#ffcccc"
| 1
| April 24
| @ Miami
| L 98–116
| Vince Carter (27)
| Vince Carter (10)
| Vince Carter (8)
| American Airlines Arena20,212
| 0–1
|- align="center" bgcolor="#ffcccc"
| 2
| April 26
| @ Miami
| L 87–104
| Nenad Krstić (27)
| Collins, Krstić (8)
| Best, Kidd (5)
| American Airlines Arena20,276
| 0–2
|- align="center" bgcolor="#ffcccc"
| 3
| April 28
| Miami
| L 105–108 (2OT)
| Vince Carter (36)
| Jason Kidd (16)
| Jason Kidd (13)
| Continental Airlines Arena20,174
| 0–3
|- align="center" bgcolor="#ffcccc"
| 4
| May 1
| Miami
| L 97–110
| Jason Kidd (25)
| Vince Carter (10)
| Jason Kidd (7)
| Continental Airlines Arena20,174
| 0–4
|-

Player statistics

Regular season

|-
|          
|76 ||6 ||19.2 ||.420 ||.306 ||.885 ||1.4 ||1.9 ||0.9 ||0.1 ||6.8
|-         
|          
|64 ||17 ||20.5 ||.382 ||.315 ||.822 ||3.0 ||1.0 ||0.6 ||0.1 ||7.0
|-         
|          
|10 ||0 ||5.0 ||.000 || ||0.500 ||1.1 ||0.3 ||0 ||0.1 ||0.2
|-         
|          
|57 ||56 ||38.9 ||.462 ||.425 ||.817 ||5.9 ||4.7 ||1.5 ||0.6 ||27.5
|-         
|          
|80 ||80 ||31.8 ||.412 ||.333 ||.656 ||6.1 ||1.3 ||0.9 ||0.9 ||6.4
|-         
|          
|11 ||0 ||5.5 ||.286 ||.333 ||1.00 ||0.8 ||0.1 ||0.2 ||0.1 ||1.2
|-         
|          
|3 ||0 ||5.3 ||1.00 || ||1.00 ||2.3 ||0.3 ||0.3 ||0.3 ||2.7
|-         
|          
|33 ||33 ||41.1 ||.422 ||.337 ||.844 ||7.3 ||4 ||1 ||0.5 ||22.2
|-         
|          
|66 ||65 ||36.9 ||.398 ||.360 ||.740 ||7.4 ||8.3 ||1.9 ||0.1 ||14.4
|-         
|          
|75 ||57 ||26.2 ||.493 ||.000 ||.725 ||5.3 ||1 ||0.4 ||0.8 ||10.0
|-         
|          
|18 ||3 ||21.7 ||.411 ||.000 ||.700 ||2.2 ||1.1 ||0.9 ||0.1 ||7.6
|-         
|          
|8 ||0 ||3 ||.750 || ||.500 ||0.9 ||0 ||0 ||0.1 ||1.0
|-         
|          
|18 ||14 ||25.4 ||.453 || ||.593 ||7.1 ||0.8 ||0.3 ||2.3 ||10.4
|-         
|          
|43 ||8 ||12 ||.448 ||.375 ||.697 ||1.6 ||1 ||0.6 ||0 ||5.0
|-         
|          
|29 ||0 ||20.7 ||.361 ||.379 ||.692 ||3.3 ||1 ||0.6 ||0.5 ||6.0
|-         
|          
|54 ||14 ||21.6 ||.398 ||.324 ||.768 ||4.5 ||1.6 ||0.6 ||0.3 ||6.3
|-         
|          
|45 ||2 ||14.4 ||.419 ||.500 ||.745 ||2.5 ||0.8 ||0.6 ||0.3 ||3.7
|-         
|          
|9 ||0 ||3.6 ||.300 ||.500 ||.500 ||0.6 ||0.1 ||0 ||0 ||0.9
|-         
|         
|25 ||0 ||14.2 ||.362 ||.304 ||.778 ||1.4 ||0.7 ||0.6 ||0 ||3.7
|-         
|       
|21 ||21 ||35.2 ||.470 ||.425 ||.685 ||4.5 ||2.0 ||0.8 ||0.1 ||12.6
|-         
|        
|19 ||0 ||7.9 ||.519 || ||.900 ||1.6 ||0.3 ||0.2 ||0.3 ||1.9

Playoffs

Awards and records
 Jason Kidd, NBA All-Defensive Second Team

See also
 2004–05 NBA season

References

New Jersey Nets season
New Jersey Nets seasons
New Jersey Nets
New Jersey Nets
21st century in East Rutherford, New Jersey
Meadowlands Sports Complex